Pol Theis (born February 10, 1968) is a Luxembourger attorney and interior designer. He is the founder and principal of the international interior design firm P&T Interiors, which is based in New York City. Before pursuing interior design, he was a corporate lawyer, based in Luxembourg and Paris.

Personal background 
Theis was born on February 10, 1968, in Luxembourg. He attended Panthéon-Assas University, graduating in 1993, with a Master's degree in Business and Tax Law. The following year, he graduated from Paris-Sorbonne University with a Master's in Business and Economic Law. He was admitted to the Luxembourg Bar in 1995.

Professional background 
Law
After graduating from Paris Sorbonne University, Theis began practicing law in Luxembourg at Wildgen Spielmann & Ries. In 1996, he moved to Paris and continued his practice at Stibbe Simont Monahan Duhot, before joining the staff of Haarmann Hemmelrath.

Interior design
In 2002, he relocated to New York and established the interior design firm of P&T Interiors. He designed his own 2,000-square-foot Manhattan loft apartment (formally a carpet warehouse), which was later featured in New York Home magazine and The Wall Street Journal. He has designed for clients in New York City, The Hamptons, France, and Luxembourg. His interior design work has been published in over 50 journals, including New York Spaces, The New York Observer, Elle Decor, Objeckt International, and Michèle Schumacher magazine. His work has also been presented in the 2013 book, East Coast Modern: Contemporary Residential Architecture and Interiors.

Honors and awards 
 2011: International Property Awards in association with Bloomberg Television
 2012: Top 50 Designers by New York Spaces
 2013 Top 50 Designers by New York Spaces
 2014 Top 50 Designers by New York Spaces

Published Work 
—Magazines—
2006
  Residences Decoration
  Residences Decoration  
 Uhmepbep

2007
 4homes 
 Elle Décor 
 New York Home, May/June 2007, pages 96-99
 Elle Decoration
 Residences Decoration
 L'Expansion
 Elle Decoration
 Architectural Digest
 Elle Décor

2008
 New York Spaces
 Les Plus Beaux Interieurs
 Residences Decoration
 Architectural Digest
 Uhmepbep
 In/Out

2009
  New York Spaces
 Objekt International
 Objekt International
 Residences Decoration
 Toute la Maison
 Architectural Digest
 Uhmepbep
 Objekt International

2010
 Michele Schumacher, no2, pages 138-143 
 New York Spaces
 New York Observer
 Residences Decoration
 Uhmepbep
 Elle Decoration
 Revue

2011
 Michele Schumacher
 World's Best 2011
 Property Summit 2011
 Wall Street Journal
 Residences Decoration

2012
 International Property, British Airways
 International Property
 International Property, Emirates
 New York Spaces
 Les Plus Beaux Interieurs
 L'Eventail
 Residences Decoration
 Harper's Bazaar
 Hong Kong
 City Magazine

2013
 New York Spaces
 Villa
 New York Spaces
 Hamptons Cottages and Gardens
 New York Spaces - Top 50 Designers
 Residences Decoration
 New York Spaces

2014
 Simply You Living
 NY Spaces
 NY Spaces
 Living Etc
 South China Morning Post

2015
 Elle Decoration
 Eigen Huis & Interieur
 Marie Claire Maison

—Books—
2012
 Interiors New York
 Interiors New York

2013
 Interiors New York
 Luxury Interiors
 East Coast Modern

References 

1968 births
Living people